In 1979, Loki Schmidt (1919–2010), the spouse of former German Federal chancellor Helmut Schmidt, founded the  ("Foundation for the protection of endangered plants") which became the  ("Foundation Nature Conservancy Hamburg and for the protection of endangered plants") in 1985. One of the main purposes of this organisation is a public awareness campaign about the ecological value of wildflowers. This campaign which celebrate a wildflower of the year was established in 1980. The announcement for the flower of the year is often published in October and events to protect the critically endangered, endangered or vulnerable wildflowers are organised. In 2003, Schmidt published a book about this campaign with watercolour illustrations of the plants by herself and a foreword titled "With Loki's eyes" written by Siegfried Lenz.

List of wildflowers announced as Flower of the Year in Germany

References

External links 
 Official website of the Loki Schmidt Stiftung that initiated the Flower of the Year Campaign

Lists of endangered species
Lists of biota of Germany